The Hallstätterkalk Formation is a geologic formation in Germany and Slovakia. It preserves fossils dating back to the Triassic period.

See also

 List of fossiliferous stratigraphic units in Germany
 List of fossiliferous stratigraphic units in Slovakia

References
 

Triassic Germany